Eugene Mathew Brabender (August 16, 1941 – December 27, 1996), nicknamed Lurch, was an American Major League Baseball pitcher. He was signed by the Los Angeles Dodgers as an amateur free agent before the 1961 season. He also was a member of the US Army from 1963 to 1964. He pitched for the Baltimore Orioles (1966–1968), Seattle Pilots / Milwaukee Brewers (1969–1970). During a 5-year baseball career, Brabender compiled 35 wins, 440 strikeouts, and a 4.25 earned run average.

Brabender, described by pitcher Steve Barber as "a hard-throwing right-handed country boy," made his Major League debut in relief on May 11, 1966. He entered a tie game against the Chicago White Sox in the top of the 10th inning at Memorial Stadium and gave up a run in the 11th, resulting in a 3–2 Orioles loss. He was part of the Orioles' 1966 World Series champion team, but did not appear in a World Series game. Brabender was 16–14 with a 3.39 ERA in 82 games (30 starts) during his time in Baltimore. He pitched the best game of his career on August 7, 1967, against the Cleveland Indians, tossing a four-hit shutout while striking out 12 batters. 

He along with Gordon Lund was traded from the Orioles to the Seattle Pilots for Chico Salmon on March 31, 1969. Brabender led Seattle with 13 wins in their only season in the Pacific Northwest. The Pilots moved to Milwaukee during 1970 spring training and became the Brewers, and in what would be his final season, Brabender compiled a 6–15 record with one save and a 6.02 ERA in 29 games (21 starts).

Brabender died of a brain aneurysm at age 55 on December 27, 1996.

References

1971 Baseball Register published by The Sporting News

External links

Pura Pelota
The Deadball Era

1941 births
1996 deaths
Albuquerque Dukes players
Baltimore Orioles players
Baseball players from Wisconsin
Great Falls Electrics players
Major League Baseball pitchers
Milwaukee Brewers players
Orlando Dodgers players
Rochester Red Wings players
Salem Dodgers players
Salt Lake City Angels players
Seattle Pilots players
Sportspeople from Madison, Wisconsin
St. Petersburg Saints players
Tiburones de La Guaira players
American expatriate baseball players in Venezuela
Wisconsin–Whitewater Warhawks baseball players